Jack Ryan: Shadow Recruit is a 2014 American action thriller film based on the character Jack Ryan created by author Tom Clancy. It is the fifth film in the Jack Ryan series and the second reboot thereof. Unlike its predecessors, it is not an adaptation of a particular Clancy novel, but rather an original story. Chris Pine stars in the title role, becoming the fourth actor to play Ryan, following Alec Baldwin, Harrison Ford, and Ben Affleck. The film is directed by Kenneth Branagh, who also stars alongside Kevin Costner, and Keira Knightley.

The original screenplay was written by Adam Cozand and David Koepp. The film was produced by Mace Neufeld, Lorenzo di Bonaventura, David Barron and Mark Vahradian, with David Ellison, Dana Goldberg, Paul Schwake and Tommy Harper as executive producers. The film score was composed by Patrick Doyle.

The film was released in the United States on January 17, 2014. It grossed over $130 million and was met with mixed critical reviews. It is dedicated to Clancy, who died on October 1, 2013.

Plot
After the September 11 attacks, Jack Ryan, studying at the London School of Economics, becomes a U.S. Marine officer serving in Afghanistan, until his spine is critically injured while saving two of his fellow Marines when his helicopter is shot down. During a lengthy recovery back in the United States, he meets Cathy Muller, a medical student helping him to recover. Later, Thomas Harper, a veteran CIA official, recruits Jack.

Ten years later, Ryan is working on Wall Street covertly for the CIA looking for suspicious financial transactions that indicate terrorist activity, while Muller is now his fiancée. When Russia loses a key vote before the United Nations and the markets do not respond as expected, Ryan discovers that billions of dollars possessed by Russian business interests, most of which belong directly or indirectly to Russian oligarch Viktor Cherevin, have disappeared.

Ryan's employer conducts business with one of Cherevin's businesses. When Ryan finds certain accounts inaccessible to him as an auditor, he uses it as a legitimate excuse to visit Moscow and investigate. After narrowly surviving an attempt on his life by an assassin posing as his bodyguard, Ryan contacts the CIA and is surprised that his backup is Harper. During their debrief at Staraya Square, Ryan explains how Cherevin's web of international investments make the United States vulnerable to complete financial collapse following a staged terrorist attack.

The next day, Ryan is met by Katya, who escorts him to Cherevin's office. At their meeting, he is told that the problem company and all its assets have just been sold, preventing an audit. Meanwhile, Muller suspects that Ryan is having an affair and flies to Moscow. Against protocol for unmarried couples, Ryan reveals his CIA employment to her. Improvising on the situation, Harper convinces Muller to help them infiltrate Cherevin's offices. Ryan and Muller meet Cherevin at an upscale restaurant across the street from the office. Ryan, who supposedly had too much to drink already before dinner, acts boorish and Muller suggests he "take a walk." Having obtained Cherevin's access card, Ryan enters Cherevin's office, where he downloads crucial files from the computer. While Muller remains with Cherevin distracting him with a variety of topics, she notices symptoms that reveal he has cirrhosis and asks him about it.

The suspicious activity on Cherevin's computer is detected, and guards rush through the building to locate the intruder. Katya is alerted to find Cherevin, who in a rage takes Muller out of the restaurant to return to his office. On the street, they run into Ryan, who apologizes for his behavior and leaves with Muller. Cheverin's men locate and invade the CIA group's base and kidnap Muller. Enraged, Ryan follows and rescues her.

Ryan and the CIA discover Cherevin has secretly propped up the struggling Chinese and Japanese state economies for years, leaving the U.S. economy vulnerable, as well as using a falsified death certificate to place his son, Aleksandr, in the U.S. as a sleeper agent. Ryan uses his talent for pattern recognition to determine that Aleksandr will execute a terrorist attack on Wall Street. Returning to New York City, he locates and catches up to a fake police response vehicle driven by Aleksandr, and discovers a bomb inside the vehicle. Unable to defuse it, he hijacks the vehicle and crashes it into the East River while jumping out; the bomb detonates, killing Aleksandr. Cherevin's fellow conspirators kill him to cover their tracks. Afterwards, Ryan, now married, and Harper are called to the White House to brief the President on their next move.

Cast

 Chris Pine as Jack Ryan
 Keira Knightley as Dr. Catherine "Cathy" Muller
 Kevin Costner as Thomas Harper
 Kenneth Branagh as Viktor Cherevin
 Lenn Kudrjawizki as Konstantin 
 Alec Utgoff as Aleksandr Borovsky
 Elena Velikanova as Katya
 Peter Andersson as Dimitri Lemkov
 Nonso Anozie as Embee Deng 
 Colm Feore as Rob Behringer. Feore also appeared in The Sum of All Fears, as a supporting character, Olson. 
 Gemma Chan as Amy Chang 
 David Paymer as Dixon Lewis
 Karen David as FBI Lead Agent
 Eric Michels as FBI Operative
 John Schwab as New York DWP Worker

Mikhail Baryshnikov makes an uncredited appearance as Interior Minister Sergey Sorokin

Production

Development
After the financial success of their film The Sum of All Fears (2002), Paramount Pictures made attempts to continue the Jack Ryan film series, but nothing came to fruition. According to Mace Neufeld, Ben Affleck was not hired to reprise his role in future films after his involvement with the box office flop Gigli, stalling the series as the producers failed to recast the role. In 2008, the company engaged director Sam Raimi to spearhead a revival of the series, but he later dropped out due to focus on the development of the ultimately unproduced Spider-Man 4.

In October 2009, Paramount and co-financier Skydance Productions were negotiating with actor Chris Pine to portray Jack Ryan in a film based on Tom Clancy's character, but not on any of the books. At the time, producers Mace Neufeld and Lorenzo di Bonaventura were working with an original concept drafted by Hossein Amini, with David Ready serving as co-producer for di Bonaventura. In August 2010, director Jack Bender was the frontrunner to direct the film, based on a script tentatively titled Moscow by Adam Cozad. The following month, writer Anthony Peckham was brought on to perform rewrites, and later Steve Zaillian, who wrote the screenplay for Clear and Present Danger (1994), was engaged to perform rewrites as well. However, Zaillian withdrew after a few weeks and the film was put on hold by Paramount for Pine to reprise his role as James T. Kirk in Star Trek Into Darkness. During this time, David Koepp was brought on to rewrite the script, with shooting scheduled to begin in the second half of 2012.

The film faced another setback in March 2012, when director Bender dropped out due to scheduling conflicts. Paramount and Skydance Pictures quickly hired Kenneth Branagh to replace him, in order to start production after Pine was finished with Into Darkness around September 2012. "This script arrived and was un-put-down-able and I knew the previous films, I'd read some of the books and, simple as that, it came out of the blue", said Branagh. "I was going to be making another movie, but it went away and this one came to me and I read it and responded very strongly and it's the kind of the film that I go to see".

Filming

Pre-production for Jack Ryan: Shadow Recruit took place at the production offices of August Street Films Limited, based at Pinewood Studios in Buckinghamshire. Months after signing on as director, Kenneth Branagh also made a deal with the studio to star as the film's villain.

In early August 2012, Keira Knightley, Felicity Jones, and Evangeline Lilly were being considered for the female lead while Kate Beckinsale and Jessica Biel were approached but declined. Days later, Knightley won the role. That same month, Kevin Costner signed on to play Thomas Harper in a two-picture deal that would have also seen him play the character in a film adaptation of Clancy's Without Remorse.

While images from the film's production in Manhattan surfaced in late August 2012, Paramount Pictures and Skydance Productions did not announce the start of principal photography on Jack Ryan: Shadow Recruit until September 18, 2012. At that time, filming took place in Liverpool city centre, which doubled as Moscow. Filming in New York City had been completed earlier that month. Other shooting locales included London and Moscow. Later, reshoots were also done in New York City.

Music
The musical score of Jack Ryan: Shadow Recruit was composed by Patrick Doyle, who has collaborated on many of Kenneth Branagh's directorial efforts. Writing the score took Doyle up to seven months, which is more than usual. "In Jack Ryan, [Kenneth] wanted a piece of music for this scene and I had the theme the following day for it," said Doyle on his relationship with Branagh. "I actually wrote the main theme of the movie, just sitting there watching it. This is the expectation of a person you're very close to. There's no pressure in that you're so relaxed, especially someone like Kenneth. He brings out the best in you because he creates such a casual, relaxed, but hard-working environment at the same time." A soundtrack album was released digitally by Varèse Sarabande on January 14, 2014 and in physical formats on February 4.

Track listing

Release
The film was originally scheduled to be released on December 25, 2013, but was pushed back from its original release date to January 17, 2014, by Paramount Pictures to give the release date to Martin Scorsese's The Wolf of Wall Street. It then was slated for release on January 17, 2014, corresponding with the Martin Luther King Jr. holiday in the United States. In August 2013, Paramount began rolling out a trailer for the film to test audiences bearing the title Jack Ryan: Shadow One. On October 2, 2013, a day after the death of Tom Clancy, the first film poster was released, featuring the new title, Jack Ryan: Shadow Recruit. The first trailer for the film was released the same day. In December 2014, Pine confirmed that there would not be a sequel to the film due to its lackluster box office performance.

The film was later released in Video on Demand format for home media markets on May 20, 2014. It was released on DVD and Blu-ray formats by Paramount Home Entertainment on June 10, 2014.

Reception

Box office
Jack Ryan: Shadow Recruit earned $5.4 million on its opening day in North American markets. and reached $17.2 million by the end of its opening weekend. The film opened below all previous Jack Ryan films despite a wider theatre count. Based on exit-polling service CinemaScore, more than a third of the film's opening weekend audience was over the age of 50. With only 15 percent of viewers under the age of 25, the film failed to attract younger viewers despite the casting of Chris Pine. The film is the twenty-fourth highest grossing of 2014 and was the first film of the year to have reached over $100 million worldwide. During its theatrical run, the film had grossed $50.6 million domestically and $85 million in foreign business, for a worldwide total of $135.6 million.

Critical response
On Rotten Tomatoes, the film holds an approval rating of 54% based on 187 reviews, with an average rating of 5.6/10. The website's critics consensus reads: "It doesn't reinvent the action-thriller wheel, but Jack Ryan: Shadow Recruit offers a sleek, reasonably diverting reboot for a long-dormant franchise." Metacritic assigned the film a weighted average score of 57 out of 100, based on 36 critics, indicating "mixed or average reviews". Audiences polled by CinemaScore gave the film an average grade of "B" on an A+ to F scale.

Peter Hartlaub of the San Francisco Chronicle gave the film a positive review, saying, "Under taut direction from Kenneth Branagh (who also plays the Russian heavy), Pine is convincing as a character who is pushing papers one day and dodging assassins in Moscow the next." Hartlaub added, "Even with its thrifty set pieces and smaller ambitions, this attempt to reboot the series based on Tom Clancy characters does the most important thing right: It almost always feels like a Jack Ryan movie." Kyle Smith of the New York Post also gave the film a positive review. Smith said, "Despite the occasional hard-to-believe moment, the reboot of the 1990s franchise is soundly structured, smart and fast, with a plausible central scenario, several gripping moments and well-wrought dialogue. If it isn't quite as gritty or intelligent as the Bourne movies, it is ... close enough."

Peter Travers of Rolling Stone was less enthusiastic about the film, saying it "has no personality of its own." Travers added, "It's a product constructed out of spare parts and assembled with computerized precision. It's hard to care when Jack turns operational and becomes a CIA robocop. The movie feels untouched by human hands." Todd McCarthy of The Hollywood Reporter also gave the film a negative review, saying, "While [the film] benefits from an attractive cast, the perennial allure of the spy game and the exoticism of the contemporary Moscow setting, the biggest problem afflicting this modest diversion is that it's the sort of film in which computers get to the bottom of every problem that comes up in about five seconds."

References
Footnotes

External links
 
 
 
 
 
 

2014 films
2010s spy films
American political thriller films
2010s English-language films
2010s Russian-language films
Techno-thriller films
American action thriller films
American spy films
Films about cancer
Films about terrorism in the United States
Films set in Afghanistan
Films set in London
Films set in Washington, D.C.
Films set in Moscow
Films set in Michigan
Films set in Pennsylvania
Films set in Manhattan
Films shot in Liverpool
Films shot in London
Films shot in New York City
Films shot in Moscow
Films shot in Montreal
Films based on works by Tom Clancy
IMAX films
Skydance Media films
Paramount Pictures films
Reboot films
Ryanverse films
Films directed by Kenneth Branagh
Films with screenplays by David Koepp
Films scored by Patrick Doyle
Films produced by David Barron
Films produced by Lorenzo di Bonaventura
Films produced by Mace Neufeld
Di Bonaventura Pictures films
Films set in 2001
Films set in 2003
Films set in 2013
Films based on the September 11 attacks
2010s American films